Musinci is a village in the municipality of Mogila, North Macedonia. It used to be part of the former municipality of Dobruševo.

Demographics
The Yugoslav census of 1953 recorded 1222 people of whom 1200 were Turks, 18 Macedonians, 1 Albanian and 3 others. The 1961 Yugoslav census recorded 575 people of whom 480 were Macedonians, 90 Turks, 4 Albanians and 7 others. The 1971 census recorded 396 people of whom 361 were Macedonians, 31 Turks, 1 Albanian and 3 others. The 1981 Yugoslav census recorded 388 people of whom 353 were Macedonians, 21 Turks, 13 Bosniaks and 2 others. The Macedonian census of 1994 recorded 309 people of whom 284 were Macedonians, 24 Turks and 1 Albanian.

According to the 2002 census, the village had a total of 302 inhabitants. Ethnic groups in the village include:

Macedonians 284
Turks 16
Albanians 1
Serbs 1

References

External links

Villages in Mogila Municipality
Turkish communities in North Macedonia